Johann Jacob Hess (or Johann Jakob Hess)  (21 October 1741 in Zürich - 29 May 1828 in Zürich) was a Protestant Swiss theologian and clergyman.

Life
Hess's father was the town clock maker Salomon Hess. He studied from 1755 to 1760 in Collegium Carolinum Zürich, followed by his ordination as   In 1767 he married Anna Maria Schinz from Embrach, in 1777 he was appointed deacon of Fraumünster, in 1795 rector und Antistes of the clergy of the  Canton of Zürich.

He is known as the pioneer of literature of the quest for the historical Jesus through his Geschichte der drei letzten Lebensjahre Jesu (Zürich 1768) and Lebensgeschichte Jesu (8th edition, 1823).

Posthumously published was his Briefe über die Offenbarung Johannis (Zürich 1844).

Works
 Meine Bibel. Ein Gesang. Freunden d. Bibelanstalten gewiedmet von Johann Jakob Heß. 2.,hdl..rm. u. verb. Auflage. Zürich: Orell, Füßli u. Co., 1821.
 Geschichte und Schriften der Apostel Jesu. Von dem Verfasser der Geschichte Jesu. 1773  1. Aufl., 1775 2. Aufl., Jew. Zürich. Dgl., - Mit einer Beilage von Anmerkungen für catholische Leser -, Salzburg, Mayr. 1791.

References 

 Georg Gessner: Blicke auf das Leben und Wesen des verewigten Johann Jakob Hess, Antistes der Kirche Zürich. Bey Orell, Füßli und Compagnie, Zürich 1829.
 Heinrich Escher: Joh. Jak. Hess., Skizze seines Lebens und seiner Ansichten mit einem Auszuge aus seiner ungedruckten Auslegung der Apokalypse. Zürich 1837.
 Friedhelm Ackva: Johann Jakob Heß (1741 - 1828) und seine Biblische Geschichte. Leben, Werk und Wirkung des Zürcher Antistes. Lang, Bern [u. a.] 1992, .
 
  (NDB). Band 9, Duncker & Humblot, Berlin 1972, S. 2 f. (Digitalisat).
  (BBKL). Band 2, Bautz, Hamm 1990, Sp. 786–787.

External links
 
 

1741 births
1828 deaths

Swiss theologians
19th-century Calvinist and Reformed theologians